Council of Ministers of Bolivia, or Cabinet of Bolivia, is part of the executive branch of the Bolivian government, consisting of the heads of the variable number of government ministries. The Council of Ministers are ministers of state and conduct the day-to-day business of public administration within Bolivia. The President of Bolivia may freely reorganize the executive branch, with the most recent comprehensive reorganization occurring in February 2009. Since then, the Ministry for the Legal Defense of the State has become the independent office of Solicitor General, and the Ministry of Communication has been created.

Current Cabinet

Resources
Ministry of Foreign Relations
Ministry of Government
Ministry of the Presidency
Ministry of Defense
Ministry of Education
Ministry Hacienda
Ministry of Planification

Notes

References

Government of Bolivia
Bolivia